R: Racing Evolution (R: Racing in Europe) is a racing video game released on the GameCube, PlayStation 2 and Xbox by Namco. It is a spin-off of the Ridge Racer series. Unlike the latter, the game uses licensed racecars rather than fictional vehicles featured in the franchise. The Xbox version is not compatible with Xbox 360. The GameCube version features Pac-Man VS as a separate disc.

Gameplay
R-Racing: Evolution is a racing game featuring over 33 licensed cars from various motorsports series (such as the JGTC, WRC, and the 24 Hours of Le Mans), and in-depth configuration options such as adjusting the brakes, front-wheel stabilizers, and car weight. Other features concerning gameplay include drifts, Nitro adjustments, and individual classes and attributes for every car. The game also features a system referred to as the pressure meter, a gauge that is displayed above every car which fills up as the player gets closer to a rival car; the higher the meter, the greater the likelihood that the AI will make a critical mistake. Most of the time, when the player overtakes an NPC, it will trigger a dialog, complimenting your movements, and it might also trigger a dialog when the pressure meter is full/half-full, with the opponent slowly feeling the pressure, ending up, most likely, screaming out of control.

The game offers a story mode where the player follows the racing career of Rena Hayami as she struggles to deal with the busy life of a professional race car driver and the politics of the sport. The mode features 14 chapters, in which the player earns new cars, RP points for new purchases, and views pre-rendered cutscenes preceding every chapter.
Other modes include the usual racing game fare: single races, time attacks, a versus mode, and car customization.

Plot
Rena Hayami is introduced as a Japanese ambulance driver. On one afternoon, she responds to an accident at Twin Ring Motegi. Pressed for time, Rena pushes her driving skills to the limit in order to deliver the injured racer to the hospital. Along for the ride with his injured team member, the former racing engineer and now team manager Stephan Garnier is impressed enough to offer Rena a chance to become a racing driver herself. She accepts and joins Stephan's team, oblivious to the fact that the team is sponsored by a shadowy corporation called GVI, which determines the placing of the racers in the race, as shown in one of the chapters, when Rena (the player) is forced to place second, not first. At first, Rena benefits from the company's influence and is given equipment and opportunities to race in major events. However, she quickly develops a bitter rivalry with independent Spanish veteran racer Gina Cavalli. It is later revealed that Gina despises GVI, and her contempt for the company spills over to Rena, whom Gina considers to be their pawn. Later, when the first rally race chapter was introduced, Stephan's team mechanic Eddie is introduced, and it is revealed that Stephan was once a very good team manager until an accident occurred involving one of his racers, he was forced to resign. Towards the end of Rena's rookie season, Eddie comes up with a plan to leave GVI with Stephan and Rena. Months later, they form a new team without GVI's influence and Gina finds new respect for Rena, and the two become friends while continuing their rivalry on the racetrack.

Development
The soundtrack of the game was composed by Yuu Miyake, Hiroshi Okubo, and Akitaka Tohyama, with additional contributions by Koji Nakagawa, Satoru Kosaki, and Keiki Kobayashi. Almost 11 years after the game's initial release, it was released as R: Racing Evolution Direct Audio by SuperSweep Records on September 19, 2014.

The original Japanese box cover displayed a De Tomaso Pantera GT5. For the North American release, the box art was tailored to the domestic audience by changing the image to a Dodge Viper. Similarly, for the European release the image was again changed to a regional supercar, the McLaren F1 GTR.

Reception

The game received "average" reviews on all platforms according to the review aggregation website Metacritic. In Japan, Famitsu gave it a score of all four eights on each platform for a total of 32 out of 40.

The gameplay was described as a compromise between simulation and arcade. The story was considered interesting enough to keep the player interested in an otherwise dull series of races. Graphically, the game was more or less identical on all platforms. On the other hand, the game was found lacking in comparison to other racing titles on the Xbox.

References

External links
 

2003 video games
Electronic Arts games
Multiplayer and single-player video games
Namco games
GameCube games
PlayStation 2 games
Racing video games
Ridge Racer
Video games developed in Japan
Video games featuring female protagonists
Video games scored by Satoru Kōsaki
Video games scored by Yuu Miyake
Xbox games